Scotchman Creek is a  long 2nd order tributary to the Deep River in Moore County, North Carolina.

Course
Scotchman Creek rises about 1 mile northwest of Parkland, North Carolina in Moore County and then flows northeast to join the Deep River about 2.5 miles northwest of High Falls, North Carolina.

Watershed
Scotchman Creek drains  of area, receives about 48.1 in/year of precipitation, and has a wetness index of 396.73 and is about 73% forested.

See also
List of rivers of North Carolina

References

Rivers of North Carolina
Rivers of Moore County, North Carolina